IQ motif and SEC7 domain-containing protein 1  also known as ARF-GEP100 (ADP-Ribosylation Factor - Guanine nucleotide-Exchange Protein -  100-kDa) is a protein that in humans is encoded by the IQSEC1 gene.

Function
The ARF-GEP100 protein is involved in signal transduction. It is a guanine nucleotide exchange factor that promotes binding of GTP to ADP ribosylation factor protein ARF6 and to a lesser extent ARF1 and ARF5. This activates the ADP-ribosylation activity of the target protein and cause it to modify its substrates. ARF-GEP100, through activation of ARF6, is therefore involved in the control of processes such as endocytosis of plasma membrane proteins, E-cadherin recycling and actin cytoskeleton remodeling. ARF-GEP100 appears particularly important in regulating cell adhesion, with reductions in the level of this protein causing enhanced spreading and attachment of cells.

It is highly expressed in the prefrontal cortex, and throughout the rest of the brain, and is believed to have a role in learning and memory, having been detected as phosphorylated in a phospho screen of the PSD.

References

Further reading

External links